Malacothamnus fasciculatus, with the common name chaparral mallow, is a species of flowering plant in the mallow family.<ref name="itis">[https://www.itis.gov/servlet/SingleRpt/SingleRpt?search_topic=TSN&search_value=21827 ITIS Report: Malacothamnus fasciculatus"  (Nutt. ex Torr. & A. Gray) Greene] . accessed 1.14.2014.</ref> It is found in far western North America.

Distribution
The plant is native to southern California and northern Baja California, where it is a common member of the chaparral and coastal sage scrub plant communities.

DescriptionMalacothamnus fasciculatus is a shrub with a slender, multibranched stem growing  in height. It is coated thinly to densely in white or brownish hairs.

The leaves are oval or rounded in shape, 2 to 11 centimeters long, and sometimes divided into lobes. The inflorescence is an elongated cluster of many pale pink flowers with petals under a centimeter long.

Varieties
It is a highly variable plant which is sometimes described as a spectrum of varieties, and which is sometimes hard to differentiate from other Malacothamnus species. 
Varieties of the species currently named include:
 Malacothamnus fasciculatus var. catalinensis — Santa Catalina Island bush-mallow; endemic to Catalina Island, one of the Channel Islands of California.
 Malacothamnus fasciculatus var. fasciculatus.
 Malacothamnus fasciculatus var. nesioticus — Santa Cruz Island bush mallow; a rare plant endemic to Santa Cruz Island, one of the Channel Islands, on which only ~120 individual plants remain.  It is federally listed as an endangered species.
 Malacothamnus fasciculatus var. nuttallii'' — endemic to California in the Outer South Coast Ranges, and Western Transverse Ranges.

References

External links

 CalFlora Database:  Malacothamnus fasciculatus (chaparral mallow)
Jepson Manual Treatment of Malacothamnus fasciculatus
USDA Plants Profile: Malacothamnus fasciculatus
Malacothamnus fasciculatus — U.C. Photo gallery

fasciculatus
Flora of California
Flora of Baja California
Flora of the California desert regions
Flora of the Sonoran Deserts
Natural history of the California chaparral and woodlands
Natural history of the California Coast Ranges
Natural history of the Channel Islands of California
Natural history of the Colorado Desert
Natural history of the Peninsular Ranges
Natural history of the San Francisco Bay Area
Natural history of the Santa Monica Mountains
Natural history of the Transverse Ranges
Flora without expected TNC conservation status